Erind Selimaj (born 22 May 1989 in Shkodër) is an Albanian football player who plays for Flamurtari Pristina in the Football Superleague of Kosovo.

Club career
Selimaj joined Kosovan side Flamurtari from Vllaznia in summer 2019.

References

1989 births
Living people
Footballers from Shkodër
Albanian footballers
Association football goalkeepers
KF Tërbuni Pukë players
Luftëtari Gjirokastër players
KS Ada Velipojë players
KF Vllaznia Shkodër players
KF Flamurtari players
Kategoria Superiore players
Kategoria e Parë players
Football Superleague of Kosovo players
Albanian expatriate footballers
Expatriate footballers in Kosovo
Albanian expatriate sportspeople in Kosovo